Jesperson is a surname. Notable people with the surname include:

 Keith Hunter Jesperson (born 1955), Canadian-American serial killer
 Paul Jesperson (born 1992), American basketball player
 Peter Jesperson, American music-industry businessman

See also
Jespersen